El Tiempo Latino is a Spanish-language free-circulation weekly newspaper published in Washington, D.C. The paper was founded in 1991 and acquired by The Washington Post Company in 2004. After Nash Holdings, the Jeff Bezos-controlled company, acquired the Post in 2013, el Tiempo Latino was sold to Javier Marin, a Venezuelan-American businessman, in 2016.
The newspaper publishes 50,000 copies every Friday (ABC audited) distributed in 1,700 points of distribution throughout the Washington DC metropolitan area and has a weekly readership of over 120,000 readers, according to Scarborough Research.

El Tiempo Latino has received major awards from the Hispanic print industry. The publication was named the Best Hispanic Weekly in the United States by The National Association of Hispanic Publications at the 2014 José Martí Awards ceremony. This was the 14th time and the 10th year in a row that El Tiempo Latino has received this award in its 23 years' existence. More than 200 entries competed for awards. In 2014, El Tiempo Latino received a total of 14 distinctions for news stories, photography, editorial cartoon, newspaper sections, editorial video, design and web site.

Columnists
Ricardo Sánchez-Silva
Abril Gordienko López
Ana Julia Jatar
Ann Marie Benitez
Beatriz De Majo
Carlos E. Ponce
Eridania Bidó Fernández 
Fernando Pinilla
Geovanny Vicente
Héctor Schamis
José López Zamorano
Luis Alberto Perozo Padua
Luis Fernando Vélez Gutiérrez
Maibort Petit
Miguel Castro Luna
Noelia Romero Izarza
Daisy Novoa Vásquez

References

External links
Official website
The Washington Post Company to Acquire Spanish-Language Newspaper
Bienvenido a El Tiempo Latino

Hispanic and Latino American culture in Washington, D.C.
Newspapers published in Washington, D.C.
Publications established in 1991
Spanish-language mass media in Washington, D.C.
Spanish-language newspapers published in the United States
The Washington Post
Non-English-language newspapers published in Washington, D.C.
1991 establishments in Washington, D.C.